"Beautiful Morning" is the lead single for Ace of Base's 2002 record Da Capo. "Beautiful Morning" was released in September 2002 in Europe. On the charts the song was a minor hit. The song was written by the three Berggren siblings (Jonas, Jenny and Malin) in dedication to the passing of their father.

Music video
A music video was produced to promote the single. The video was directed by Daniel Borjesson.

Track listing
Scandinavia/Germany

Maxi CD
 Beautiful Morning (Album Version)
 Beautiful Morning (Spanish Fly Radio Edit)
 Beautiful Morning (Groove Radio Edit)
 Beautiful Morning (Spanish Fly Club Version)
 Beautiful Morning (Video)

CD single
 Beautiful Morning (Album Version)
 Beautiful Morning (Groove Radio Edit)

Official versions/remixes
Album Version
Groove Radio Edit
Spanish Fly Radio Edit
Spanish Fly Club Version

Release history

Charts

Ace of Base songs
2002 singles
2002 songs
Songs written by Jonas Berggren
Songs written by Linn Berggren
Mega Records singles
Songs written by Jenny Berggren